Hayden Kerr (born 10 July 1996) is an Australian cricketer. He made his List A debut on 20 November 2019, for New South Wales in the 2019–20 Marsh One-Day Cup. He made his Twenty20 debut on 18 December 2019, for the Sydney Sixers in the 2019–20 Big Bash League season. He made his first-class debut on 20 November 2021, for New South Wales in the 2021–22 Sheffield Shield season.

Domestic career
He made his List A debut on 20 November 2019, for New South Wales in the 2019–20 Marsh One-Day Cup. He made his first-class debut on 20 November 2021, for New South Wales in the 2021–22 Sheffield Shield season.

He made his Twenty20 debut for Sydney Sixers against Perth Scorchers in December 2019 during the 2019-20 Big Bash League season. On 26 January 2022 he scored 98 not out against Adelaide Strikers, his first half-century in a T20 match.

In May 2022, he signed with New South Wales. It was his first full contract with this team.

References

External links
 

1996 births
Living people
Australian cricketers
New South Wales cricketers
Sydney Sixers cricketers
Derbyshire cricketers
People from Bowral
Cricketers from New South Wales